Argyrophenga harrisi, also known as Harris's tussock or the Nelson tussock is a species of butterfly found in the northern parts of the South Island of New Zealand. It was first described by R. C. Craw in 1978.

References

Satyrini
Butterflies of New Zealand
Butterflies described in 1978